Life Is a Dream is a 1635 play by Pedro Calderón de la Barca.

Life Is a Dream may also refer to:

 Life Is a Dream (opera), a 2010 opera by Lewis Spratlan
 Life Is a Dream (1917 film), a German film by Robert Wiene
 Life Is a Dream (1986 film), a French film by Raúl Ruiz

See also
Life Is But a Dream, a 2013 autobiographical television film by Beyoncé Knowles
"Life Is Just a Dream", a 1995 song by Joel Feeney
Life Is Like a Dream, a 2004 album by Jacky Cheung